The Philippine Diamond Tower (PDT) was a proposed broadcast and observation tower to be built in the former Manila Seedling Bank property in QC CBD Triangle Park- North Triangle, Quezon City, Metro Manila, Philippines. The groundbreaking for the tower was initially scheduled to take place last October 12, 2014, in line with Quezon City's 75th foundation anniversary. Construction of the tower was planned to take place in mid 2015 and was planned to be completed in 2019.

It is set to be completed in 3 years and will be open to the public by 2017 - 2018. Philippine Diamond Tower is planned to be a major landmark not only of Manila, but the entire Philippines. A city ordinance was planned to be enacted to support the development of the tower.

In February 2016, the Japanese government was reportedly interested to invest in the project through The Corporation for the Overseas Development of Japan's ICT and Postal Services with a local subsidiary. China was also reportedly interested in the project and was likely to bid.

However, construction of PDT was cancelled due to unknown reasons when it was shelved out. Construction never commenced like the proposed Centennial Tower and the Pagcor Tower despite the introduction of Digital Terrestrial Television and ISDB-T.

See also
Pagcor Tower

References

Unbuilt buildings and structures in the Philippines
Observation towers in the Philippines
Buildings and structures in Quezon City
Radio masts and towers